Unified Sportsmen of Florida (USF) is a non-profit lobbying organization in Florida known for its connections with the National Rifle Association (NRA). The organization was founded in 1975 by Marion Hammer, the current executive director, NRA board member, and former NRA president.

Lead by Hammer, the group was responsible for Florida passing a shall issue concealed weapon and firearm license law in 1987.

See also 
 Florida Carry

References

External links 
 ProPublica Non Profit Explorer profile

1977 establishments in Florida
Gun rights advocacy groups in the United States
Lobbying organizations in the United States
National Rifle Association